Class 156 may refer to:

British Rail Class 156
Kaidai-type submarine, also known as I-156 class
Midland Railway 156 Class